A Decade Under the Influence is a 2003 American documentary film, directed by Ted Demme (posthumously released) and Richard LaGravenese. It was produced by Independent Film Channel.

Summary
It is about the "turning point" in American cinema in the 1970s: New Hollywood.  This was the final film that Ted Demme directed before his untimely death.

Inspiration
The title comes from the 1974 John Cassavetes film A Woman Under the Influence.

Reception
The film has a 77% approval rating on the website Rotten Tomatoes, based on 30 reviews. The website's consensus reads, "Packed with amusing anecdotes and told through the perspective of those it lionizes, A Decade Under the Influence is too one-sided to serve as a comprehensive dissection of 1970s American film, but will still work a treat for movie buffs."

Cast

 Robert Altman
 John G. Avildsen
 Warren Beatty (archive footage)
 Linda Blair (archive footage)
 Peter Bogdanovich
 Peter Boyle (archive footage)
 Marshall Brickman
 Ellen Burstyn
 John Calley
 Jimmy Carter (archive footage)
 John Cassavetes (archive footage)
 Julie Christie
 Clint Eastwood
 Peter Fonda (archive footage)
 Francis Ford Coppola
 Miloš Forman
 Roger Corman
 Bruce Dern
 William Friedkin
 Pam Grier
 Monte Hellman
 Dennis Hopper
 Sidney Lumet
 Paul Mazursky
 Polly Platt
 Roy Scheider
 Sydney Pollack
 Jerry Schatzberg
 Paul Schrader
 Martin Scorsese
 Sissy Spacek
 Robert Towne
 Jon Voight

See also
Easy Riders, Raging Bulls, the book by Peter Biskind about American cinema in the 1970s that was also made into a 2003 documentary

References

External links
 

2003 films
2003 documentary films
American documentary films
Documentary films about the cinema of the United States
Films directed by Ted Demme
Films directed by Richard LaGravenese
Documentary films about Hollywood, Los Angeles
Documentary films about films
2000s English-language films
2000s American films